Trubatsa tityrus is a species of sea snail, a marine gastropod mollusk in the family Muricidae, the murex snails or rock snails.

Description
The size of an adult shell varies between 5 mm and 14 mm.

Distribution
This species is found in the Caribbean Sea off Venezuela, Panama and Trinidad.

References

 Houart, R, Buge, B. & Zuccon, D. (2021). A taxonomic update of the Typhinae (Gastropoda: Muricidae) with a review of New Caledonia species and the description of new species from New Caledonia, the South China Sea and Western Australia. Journal of Conchology. 44(2): 103–147.
 Garrigues, B. (2021). Description of four new Typhinae species (Mollusca: Muricidae) and comments on the status of the genus Talityphis Jousseaume, 1882 and Trubatsa Dall, 1889. Xenophora Taxonomy. 33: 3-20.

External links
 
 Bayer, F. M. (1971). New and unusual Mollusks collected by R/V John Elliott Pillsbury and R/V Gerda in the tropical Western Atlantic. Bulletin of Marine Science. 21(1): 111-236

tityrus
Gastropods described in 1971